Viva La Bands is a music compilation album by professional skateboarder and television personality Bam Margera, released on June 21, 2005. It features songs from some of Margera's favorite artists. 

A second volume, Viva La Bands, Volume 2, was released in September 2007, coinciding with a US tour headlined by bands like Cradle of Filth, Gwar, CKY and Vains of Jenna.

Track listing
"The King of Rock 'n Roll" - Daniel Lioneye
"Soul on Fire" – HIM
"Lost Boys" – The 69 Eyes
"Cold Black Days" – Atrocity
"Guilty" – The Rasmus
"Rock'n Roll" – The Sounds
"In My Heaven" – Negative
"King" – Fireball Ministry
"All My Friends Are Dead" – Turbonegro
"Blacken My Thumb" – The Datsuns
"Mice and Gods" – Clutch
"Familiar Realm" – CKY
"Sleeping My Day Away" – D-A-D
"I Don't Care as Long as You Sing" – Beatsteaks
"Big Shot" – Kill Hannah
"English Fire" – Cradle of Filth
"Skull Heaven" – Viking Skull
"Route 666" – Helltrain
"C'mon Let's Go" – Bend Over
"Needled 24/7" – Children of Bodom
"Good Morning Headache" – Smack
"I Got Erection!" – Gnarkill

Bonus content
The album was packaged with a DVD with never-before-seen video footage of Margera and the CKY crew, shot for the TV series Viva La Bam. The footage is known as the "Lost Episode" of the series.

References

2005 compilation albums